The West Virginia Industrial Home for Boys was — from 1891 to 1983 — the state juvenile detention center for male offenders, located at Pruntytown near Grafton, West Virginia, USA.

Young male offenders, aged 12 to 20 years, were sentenced to the facility beginning in 1891. Sentencing was by the juvenile courts, or justices of the peace, for incorrigibility and immorality, and by the criminal courts for felonies. Changes in philosophy regarding youth incarceration, beginning in the 1970s, led to population declines at the Industrial Home, and its sister institution, the West Virginia Industrial Home for Girls, which had opened in 1899 at Salem. In 1983, the Industrial School for Boys closed, the girls’ facility was redesignated as the West Virginia Industrial Home for Youth, and the boys were transferred to it.

The Pruntytown Correctional Center (PCC) — a state prison for adult offenders of both genders — opened in 1985 on the old grounds of the former WV Industrial Home for Boys.

Defunct prisons in West Virginia
Buildings and structures in Taylor County, West Virginia
1891 establishments in West Virginia
1983 disestablishments in West Virginia